Sar Maleh (also known as Zīr Maleh and Zīrmoleh) is a village in Poshtkuh Rural District, Bushkan District, Dashtestan County, Bushehr Province, Iran. At the 2006 census, its population was 84, in 19 families.

References 

Populated places in Dashtestan County